KPTD may refer to:

 Potsdam Municipal Airport (ICAO code KPTD)
 KPTD-LP, a low-power television station (channel 29, virtual 51) licensed to serve Paris, Texas, United States